Cynthia Eagle Russett (February 1, 1937 ― December 5, 2013) was an American historian, noted for her studies of 19th century American intellectual history, and women and gender.

Russett was born Cynthia Eagle in Pittsburgh, Pennsylvania, on February 1, 1937. She studied history as an undergraduate at Trinity College in Washington, D.C., earning a bachelor's degree, and then did graduate work at Yale University, earning a Master's from Yale in 1959 and a Ph.D. from Yale in 1964. Her dissertation was awarded Yale's highest honor for American history dissertations, the George Washington Eggleston Prize.

She joined the Yale faculty in 1967, and was eventually appointed the Larnard Professor of History.

Russett's spouse is a fellow Yale faculty member, Bruce Russett, and the couple had four children together.

Notable works
 The Extraordinary Mrs. R: A Friend Remembers Eleanor Roosevelt (1999, with William Turner Levy)
 Second to None: A Documentary History of American Women (1993), edited with Ruth Barnes Moynihan and Laurie Crumpacker
 Sexual Science: The Victorian Construction of Womanhood (1989, Harvard University Press) (winner, Berkshire Conference of Women Historians Annual Book Award)
 Darwin in America: The Intellectual Response, 1865-1912 (1976)
 The Concept of Equilibrium in American Social Thought (1968)

Notes

1937 births
2013 deaths
Women's studies academics
Yale University faculty
Yale University alumni
Trinity Washington University alumni
American historians
Deaths from multiple myeloma
American women historians
21st-century American women